Ngawang Lobzang Thupstan Chognor, commonly known as 19th Kushok Bakula Rinpoche (19 May 1918 – 4 November 2003) was a Buddhist lama, who also served as India's ambassador to Mongolia. He is mainly known for his efforts in reviving Buddhism in Mongolia and Russia by linking them with the community of Tibetan exiles in India.

He was born in the Matho branch of the Royal House of Ladakh, India. He was the youngest child of his father, Nangwa Thayas, the titular King of Matho, and his wife, Princess Yeshes Wangmo of the Royal House of Zangla. He was recognised by the Thirteenth Dalai Lama as a reincarnation of Bakula Arhat, one of the Sixteen Arhats who in legend were direct disciples of Gautama Buddha. He was a direct descendant of the last King of Ladakh Tsepel Tondup Namgyal. He was, in fact, his great-great-great grandson.

"In 1962 ... allowed the Indian troops to convert a section of his Pethub Monastery into a makeshift military hospital. When a section of people in Kashmir demanded plebiscite, Rinpoche categorically stated that Ladakh
would never go to Pakistan and would remain with India."

Later he served in the Parliament of India, and was deeply engaged with welfare, education and rights of the Scheduled Castes and Scheduled Tribes of India. From January 1990 to October 2000, he was India's Ambassador in Mongolia. He was awarded the Padma Bhushan in 1988. The airport at Leh in the Indian region of Ladakh is named after him.

References

Further reading
 Nawang Tsering Shakspo and Henry M. Vyner, M.D. (2006): Kushok Bakula Rinpoche — Saint and Statesman, World Buddhist Culture Trust, New Delhi
Patrick Dowd, "The Nineteenth Bakula, Ngawang Lobzang Thubstan Choknor," Treasury of Lives, accessed February 04, 2021, http://treasuryoflives.org/biographies/view/Bakula-Ngawang-Lobzang-Thubstan-Choknor/13652

1917 births
2003 deaths
Ladakhi people
People from Ladakh
Recipients of the Padma Bhushan in public affairs
Ambassadors of India to Mongolia
Rinpoches